Baal with Thunderbolt or the Baal stele is a white limestone bas-relief stele from the ancient kingdom of Ugarit in northwestern Syria. The stele depicts Baal (or Hadad), the Aramean god of storm and rain, and is considered the most important of the Ugaritic stelae. The stele is on display at the Musée du Louvre in Paris.

Overview
The stele, carved into the white limestone, is wider at the base and measures . It depicts a large standing male figure representing Baal, and a smaller male figure that is thought to be the king of Ugarit.

The central figure in the stele, Baal, is shown facing to the right and standing on a large pedestal. The pedestal bears carved representations of Baal's spheres of power, the mountains and the sea. Baal is shown with a raised right hand brandishing a club or a battle-mace overhead. His left hand is stretched in front of him and holds a thunderbolt in the shape of a spearhead that extends towards the ground. The shaft is in the form of a plant, likely a cultivated grain that would be nourished by the storm. The bearded god is shown wearing a helmet decorated with bull's horns, from under which his braided hair falls over his back and his right shoulder. Baal is shown clad only in a kilt with striped decorations. The kilt is held by a finely carved wide belt that also holds a curved dagger.

Between the spear and the god a smaller figure is depicted standing on a horned altar. The smaller figure, most probably representing the king of Ugarit, is shown with a bare head and wearing ceremonial dress. The king's arms are clasped together in prayer, and are hidden under a robe trimmed with braid.

Interpretation

The stele is interpreted as showing the king receiving divine protection from the god Baal. Additionally, Baal is shown thrusting a spear of vegetation into the ground from the sky, symbolizing the necessity of the storm for a later harvest. Despite the close relationship between the king and the god depicted in the stele, the difference in size between the two figures is interpreted by historian Mark S. Smith as contrasting the power and glory of Baal with the "relative weakness of the king." Baal's fertility attributes are represented by the horned helmet, and the plant-shaped lightning rod he holds in his hand. According to historian Alberto Green, Baal is portrayed as a "vigorous, young, graceful, athletic deity marching forward."

Excavation
The stele was discovered in 1932 during excavations at Ugarit directed by French archaeologist, Claude F. A. Schaeffer. Additionally, eight more stelae were recovered from the area, while another 14 were unearthed in the Temple of Dagon and throughout the city.

See also

Baal cycle

References

Citations

Bibliography

2nd-millennium BC steles
Sculpture of the Ancient Near East
Syrian art
Archaeological discoveries in Ugarit
Near East and Middle East antiquities of the Louvre
Ancient Near East steles
1932 archaeological discoveries
Baal
Phoenician steles